Mohammad-Javad Haghshenas is an Iranian journalist and reformist politician who is member of City Council of Tehran.

References

Living people
National Trust Party (Iran) politicians
Tehran Councillors 2017–
Year of birth missing (living people)